"Second Chance" is a single by recording artist Tinchy Stryder. It is the second single from his third studio album Third Strike. It was released on 31 October 2010 as a digital download and on 1 November 2010 as a physical single. The song also features vocals from singer Taio Cruz. A music video was made for the single and was premiered on Tinchy Stryder's YouTube channel on 24 September 2010.

Track listing

Chart performance

Release history

References

External links
Second Chance on Allmusic

2010 singles
2010 songs
Tinchy Stryder songs
Taio Cruz songs
Takeover Entertainment singles
Songs with music by Tinchy Stryder
Songs written by Taio Cruz
Song recordings produced by Fraser T. Smith